The Northern Illinois Huskies men's soccer team is the college soccer team that represents Northern Illinois University (NIU) in DeKalb, Illinois, United States. The school's team competed in NIU's full-time home of the Mid-American Conference (MAC) through the 2022 season, after which the conference stopped sponsoring men's soccer. NIU will move that sport to the Missouri Valley Conference (MVC) effective with the 2023 season, joining fellow MAC members Bowling Green and Western Michigan in this move. NIU men's soccer started playing in 1962 and has appeared in the NCAA Tournament four times (1973, 2006, 2011, 2021). The Huskies are coached by Ryan Swan.

Season-by-season records

Source: NIU Men's Soccer Record Book

NCAA tournament
The Huskies have appeared in three NCAA Tournaments. Their combined record is 2–3.

LeWang Cup
Since 1981, the winner of the annual match between NIU and UW-Milwaukee claims the John LeWang Memorial Cup. The trophy is named in honor of former NIU coach John LeWang, who was killed in a car accident prior to the 1981 season. LeWang came to NIU as head coach in 1980 following his time as an assistant at UW-Milwaukee and died in a car accident after his first season leading the Huskies.

Match results

Achievements
 Mid-American Conference Tournament:
 Winners (2): 2006, 2011
 Runners-up (3): 1999, 2008, 2012
 Mid-American Conference Regular Season:
 Winners (1): 2006
 Runners-up (5): 2004, 2005, 2008, 2011, 2012
 Mid-Continent Conference Regular Season:
 Winners (1): 1990
 Big Central Soccer Conference Tournament:
 Winners (1): 1989
 Midwest Metropolitan Conference Regular Season:
 Winners (1): 1984
 Runners-up (3): 1982, 1983, 1985

Honors

All-Americans
NIU men's soccer has had seven players named to All-America teams, including two NCAA First-Team All-Americans.

Academic All-Americans
NIU men's soccer has had a combined 13 players named to CoSIDA and NSCAA Academic All-America teams, including four First-Team Academic All-Americans.

Freshman All-Americans
NIU men's soccer has had two players named to College Soccer News All-Freshman teams.

Coaches of the Year
NIU men's soccer has had three head coaches named Coach of the Year by the conference.

References

External links